Passing Mother's Grave or Langs Moeders Graf also known as Passing the Churchyard is an 1856 oil-on-canvas painting by Dutch artist Jozef Israëls. The subject of the painting is a widowed fisherman walking past his deceased wife's grave with his two children.

Israëls had been painting historical images and Passing Mother's Grave was the first in the peasant genre. The painting was considered to be a Israëls masterpiece, and it was duplicated by the artist many times. Others also made prints of the painting. 

The painting was compared to The Stone Breakers by French realist painter Gustave Courbet, and Dutch painter Vincent van Gogh compared it to the work of French painter Eugène Delacroix.

History
The painting is considered to be one of the masterpieces of Jozef Israëls' career. Dutch poet Nicolaas Beets is credited for naming the image "Passing Mother's Grave" in 1861. From 1855 to 1856 Israëls spent time in the fishing villages of Zandvoort and Katwijk where he observed the poor fishermen and their families. In 1856 he painted Langs Moeders Graf which has a tragic theme. Israëls stopped painting historical images during this period and Passing Mother's Grave is regarded as his first painting in the peasant genre.

Another title for the painting is Passing the Churchyard. There are versions of the painting at the Stedelijk Museum Amsterdam and The New Art Gallery Walsall in Walsall, England; at least one other version is known, sold to a private buyer in Vienna in 1907. The Stedelijk museum version of the painting is dated 1857. The version which is in The New Art Gallery Walsall is dated 1854 and is titled, The Widower (The Fisherman's Return).

There are other copies of the painting. In 2008 one such copy titled Passing Mother's Tomb sold in Cologne, Germany at a Lempertz auction.

Analysis 

The painting in the collection of the Stedelijk Museum Amsterdam is an oil-on-canvas painting with dimensions of  x . It is a portrayal of a widower and his children walking past the grave of his wife, the children's mother. The people in the image are all barefoot. The man is a fisherman and he is holding a boy's hand and carrying a baby as he passes the headstone of his dead wife. The painting is an attempt by Israëls to move from his traditional subject of historical paintings, toward contemporary portrayals of peasant life.

The color of the painting is nearly grey-brown and almost monochrome. The sky in the painting is dark and ominous, but there is a sliver of blue sky which is thought to represent hope. The Rijksbureau voor Kunsthistorische Documentatie stated that the models for the image were Klaas Helweg and the two children of Hendrik Helweg.

Reception

Dutch painter Vincent van Gogh counted the painting among his favorites. He was fascinated by the painting and compared it to the work of French painter Eugène Delacroix saying that he was taken in by the 'Delacroix-like technique. In  the book, Dutch Art: an Encyclopedia the authors stated that the painting documented, "...monumental treatment of the commonplace" and they said it was a "...milestone in 19th century realism in the Netherlands". They compared the painting to The Stone Breakers, an 1849 painting by French realist painter Gustave Courbet.

The painting was seen as the beginning of the second period of Israëls' development. Nicolaas Beets wrote a poem about the painting called "Children of the Sea Haarlem" in 1861. Johannes Heinrich Rennefeld and Willem Steelink Jr. made prints of the painting. The painting is considered to be a milestone for 19th-century realism in the Netherlands. Writing for Scribner's Magazine in 1912, Byron P. Stephenson (art critic of the New York Evening Post) noted that to some, the sentiment in the painting was considered "cheap "mawkish".

A statue erected in honor of Israëls, in his hometown of Groningen, depicts the figures from this painting in bronze. The statue was meant to represent his best-known work.

References

External links

1856 paintings
Paintings about death
Paintings by Jozef Israëls
Paintings of children